The International Latino Book Awards (ILBA) are annual awards given to authors, translators, and illustrators for books written in English, Spanish, or Portuguese. Founded in 1997, the ILBA is listed as a 501c3 nonprofit organization headquartered in Carlsbad, California.

The awards are produced by Empowering Latino Futures, formerly Latino Literacy Now, an organization co-founded by Edward James Olmos, Kirk Whisler, and REFORMA, the National Association to Promote Library & Information Services to Latinos and the Spanish Speaking, affiliated to the ALA (American Library Association). Other organizations associated with the ILBA include Las Comadres para Las Americas, Reforma, Los Angeles City College, Los Angeles Community College District, American Library Association, Hispanic Heritage Literature Organization, El Latino San Diego, Education Begins in the Home, International Society of Latino Authors, and the Latino 247 Media Group.  

Awards from more than 100 categories are given out, each with gold, silver, and bronze divisions, as well as honorable mentions. Each entrant must pay a fee of $90 to be considered for awards. More than 200 judges are assigned to judge the awards. The names of the judges are not revealed.

Past Award Winners 

 Rodolfo Acuña
 Isabel Allende
 Rudolfo Anaya
 Joseph Cassara
 Daína Chaviano
 Paulo Coelho
 Gabriel Garcia Marquez
 Oscar Hijuelos
 Alejandro L. Madrid
 Demetria Martinez
 Eduardo Moga
 Pablo Neruda
 Ana Nogales
 Victor Paz Otero
 Rudy Ruiz
 Alberto Sanchez Alvarez
 Nery Santos Gómez
 Mario Vargas Llosa
 Antonieta Villamil

References

External links 

 
 "2014 International Latino Book Awards Finalists Announced", El Paso Times.

American literary awards
Spanish-language literary awards
Portuguese-language literary awards
Awards established in 1997
International literary awards